The first cabinet of Mladen Milovanović was formed in April 1807. It held office until 31 December 1810, when it was dismissed and replaced by the cabinet of Jakov Nenadović.

Timeline 

The government of Serbia, known then as the Serbian Governing Council, was formed in 1805. Dukes Jakov Nenadović, Matija Nenadović, Milan Obrenović, and Sima Marković, with the assistance of Adam Jerzy Czartoryski, the minister of foreign affairs of the Russian Empire, proposed the creation of a government in order to limit Karađorđe's powers. Karađorđe accepted the formation of the government on conditions that the government would help him with military and foreign policy. With the Assembly of Uprising Champions, it represented the authority in Revolutionary Serbia. The government organized and supervised the administration, economy, judiciary, foreign policy, order, and the supply of arms for Serb forces. 

Matija Nenadović headed his cabinet until April 1807, when the office was taken over by Mladen Milovanović. The government's headquarters were in Belgrade.

Composition 
The cabinet was composed of 13 representatives from 13 nahiyahs from among whom the president was elected every month. In 1809, Stojan Pavlović, the Rudnik nahiyah representative, was replaced by Milan Obrenović.

Aftermath 
On the New Year's Day in 1810, voivode Jakov Nenadović brought in around six hundred armed men into the Assembly of Uprising Champions in order to force Karađorđe to dismiss Milovanović as the president of the Governing Council. Nenadović succeeded and became the president of the Governing Council.

References 

Cabinets of Serbia
1807 establishments in Europe
1810 disestablishments in Europe
Political history of Serbia
Cabinets established in 1807